Krasnoyarsk-North railway station is a railway station on the Bugachi-Zykov branch line of Trans-Siberian Railway in Krasnoyarsk, Russia. Local trains run between Krasnoyarsk-North and Krasnoyarsk through Bugachi weekday mornings and evenings (Monday to Friday), and some of them run through Krasnoyarsk. It takes about 37 minutes between Krasnoyarsk-North and Krasnoyarsk.

References

Railway stations in Krasnoyarsk Krai
Krasnoyarsk